Wendy Partridge is a British-born Canada-based costume designer in film and television.

Partridge was nominated for a Primetime Emmy Award for Outstanding Costumes for a Miniseries, Movie, or Special for her work on the 2006 two-part AMC series Broken Trail. She won a Canadian Screen Award for Best Costume Design for the 2014 film Pompeii and Genie Awards for Best Costume Design for Passchendaele (2008) and Loyalties (1986). She was nominated three times in one year at the 2013 Canadian Screen Awards for Resident Evil: Retribution, Silent Hill: Revelation, and Hannah's Law. Marvel Cinematic Universe film Thor: The Dark World and Guillermo del Toro's Hellboy have earned her Saturn Award nominations.

Partridge got her first dressmaking job at 14 years old whilst still in England. She moved to Edmonton in the 1970s and to Calgary in 1986. She designed the costumes for the opening and closing ceremonies of the 1988 Winter Olympics. She also designed the World War I-style uniforms that were worn at the First inauguration of Barack Obama in 2009 as well as the costume of Abraham Lincoln.

Filmography

Film

Television

Awards and nominations

References

External links 
 

Living people
Best Costume Design Genie and Canadian Screen Award winners
Canadian costume designers
English costume designers
English emigrants to Canada
Women costume designers
Year of birth missing (living people)
Canadian women in film